Mendeleev's clingfish (Lepadicyathus mendeleevi) is a species of fish in the family Gobiesocidae endemic to Madang Province in Papua New Guinea. This species is the only known member of its genus. This species was described in 2005 by Artem Mikhailovich Prokofiev, the type being collected near the village of Bongu in Madang Province from the research vessel Dmitrii Mendeleev, referred to in its specific name. The vessel was in turn named in hours of the Russian chemist Dmitrii Mendeleev (1834-1907), the creator of the most widely recognised periodic table.

References

Gobiesocidae
Taxa named by Artem Mikhailovich Prokofiev
Fish described in 2005
Endemic fauna of Papua New Guinea